Bruce Gowdy is an American guitarist, best known for his work with World Trade, and Unruly Child.

Biography
Gowdy was a founding member of World Trade with Billy Sherwood and Guy Allison. He later formed Unruly Child with Allison. He was also a member of Stone Fury and has worked with musician Mercedes. He also produced Glenn Hughes' From Now On... album from 1994. 
He toured with the Japanese rock star Eikichi Yazawa for over a decade. He was also in a futuristic space themed show band called Halyx in Disneyland Park, California in the early 80's, for which he played lead guitar and composed original songs.

Discography

with Stone Fury
 Burns Like a Star (1984)
 Let Them Talk (1986)

with World Trade
 World Trade (1989)
 Euphoria (1995)
 Unify (2017)

with Unruly Child
 Unruly Child (1992)
 Tormented (1995)
 Waiting for the Sun (1998)
 UCIII (2003)
 Worlds Collide (2010)
 Down the Rabbit Hole (2014)
 Can't Go Home (2017)
 Big Blue World (2019)
 Our Glass House (2020)

with Glenn Hughes
 Feel (1995)

Guest appearances
"Best Girl" (from the James Christian album Rude Awakening) (1995)

References

External links
Bruce Gowdy on Myspace
2003 interview

American rock guitarists
American male guitarists
Living people
Year of birth missing (living people)